San Justo Dam is a dam and reservoir in San Benito County, California, about  southwest of Hollister.  The dam provides offstream water storage for the federal Central Valley Project via the Pacheco Conduit and Hollister Conduit fed by the San Luis Reservoir.

San Justo Reservoir [CLOSED] was closed in 2008, following a Zebra Mussle infection and remains closed until further notice.

See also 
 List of lakes in California

References

External links

Dams in California
United States Bureau of Reclamation dams
Reservoirs in San Benito County, California
Dams completed in 1986
Central Valley Project
Reservoirs in California
Reservoirs in Northern California